The McCoy Report is an eight-year (1999–2007) inquiry by Elizabeth Healy and Kevin McCoy into the Brothers of Charity Order's "Holy Family School" in Galway, Ireland, and two other locations. The Report was published by the Health Service Executive in December 2007.

Abuse of disabled children over an extended period 

The report, which was begun in 1999 and made public in December 2007, found that eleven brothers and seven other staff members were alleged to have abused 21 intellectually disabled children in residential care in the period 1965–1998. By 2007, two members of staff were convicted of abuse, eight had died and the rest had retired. It emerged that the Order had attempted to transfer at least one accused brother to another place.

Vulnerable people let down by society
Jimmy Devins, a junior government minister, regretted that "some of the most vulnerable people in society were let down in the past". Brother Noel Corcoran, head of the Order's services in Ireland, apologized. However the McCoy Report was criticized by Dr Margaret Kennedy for not naming the sex offenders who were convicted or dead, and for interviewing just 21 out of 135 complainants.

Special government committee
In 2010, Kennedy has also criticised the Irish parliament's special committee to enquire into the McCoy Report for not challenging the Brothers who arranged the movements of abusers between Galway, Lota (near Cork city) and Liverpool. Police collusion is suspected and "it seems no one was called to account".

See also
Sexual abuse scandal in Galway, Kilmacduagh and Kilfenora diocese

References

Catholic Church sexual abuse scandals in Ireland
Sexual abuse scandals in Catholic orders and societies
2007 in Ireland
2007 documents
2007 in Christianity